Beat the Band is a 1947 American musical film directed by John H. Auer and written by Lawrence Kimble, Clarence Kimble and Arthur A. Ross. The film stars Frances Langford, Ralph Edwards, Phillip Terry, Gene Krupa and June Clayworth. The film was released on February 19, 1947, by RKO Pictures.

Plot 
A small town girl named Ann Rogers (Frances Langford) is fooled by a bandleader posing as an opera teacher, another man’s wife posing as the opera teacher’s wife, and $3,000 of her own money stolen to pay for musicians in the band.

Cast 
Frances Langford as Ann Rogers
Ralph Edwards as Eddie Martin
Phillip Terry as Damon Dillingham
Gene Krupa as himself
June Clayworth as Willow Martin
Mabel Paige as Mrs. Peters
Andrew Tombes as 'Professor' Enrico Blanchetti / Mr. Dillingham
Donald MacBride as P. Aloysius Duff
Mira McKinney as Mrs. Elvira Rogers
Harry Harvey, Sr. as Mr. Rogers
Grady Sutton as Harold

References

External links 
 

1947 films
American black-and-white films
1940s English-language films
RKO Pictures films
Films directed by John H. Auer
1947 musical films
Films scored by Leigh Harline
American musical films
1940s American films